Rodrique Zsorryon Benson (born October 10, 1984) is an American former professional basketball player. He works as a blog writer and an artist.

Career

High school

Benson attended Torrey Pines High School, and averaged 14 points, 8.5 rebounds and 3.8 blocks while leading the basketball team to a 25–4 record in his senior year. He was named first team all-league and second team All-CIF San Diego Section. He was rated the No. 3 center on the West Coast by TheInsiders.com. He also played three years of varsity volleyball, earning first team league honors in 2002.

College career
Benson graduated from the University of California, Berkeley, and majored in political science. After a huge improvement in his basketball from his sophomore to his junior year, Benson's senior year was marred by heel and knee injuries, which forced him to miss 11 games, impacting his future career heavily.

Professional career
In the summer of 2006, Benson played for the Sacramento Kings Summer League team. He was noticed by many NBA scouts, but was never offered a contract by any team.

When Benson left California, he started the 2006–2007 NBDL year with the Austin Toros. He had a game high of eight points on November 25, but averaged 2.4 points per game and was released by the team on January 3, 2007.

He was subsequently signed by the Dakota Wizards on January 9, 2007. In one of his first contests with the Wizards, he scored 17 points in 17 minutes. He ended the year with an average of 10.8 PPG. On March 17, 2007, he scored a personal high 27 points in a 126–100 win over the Arkansas Rimrockers. After training with the NBA's New Jersey Nets during the summer of 2007, Benson was re-signed by the Wizards for the 2007–2008 season and recorded averages of 13.6 points and a league best 12.1 rebounds per game.

On August 25, 2008, he was signed by defending French Pro-A league champion SLUC Nancy.  He requested and was granted a release on December 12, 2008. Soon after, he signed a deal with the NBDL's Dakota Wizards, his former D-League team.

On March 4, 2009, he was traded to the Reno Bighorns for Jesse Smith.

Benson has played for the Utah Jazz in the Orlando Pro Summer League, and later for the Los Angeles Clippers in the NBA Summer League in 2010.

From 2010 to 2014 he played for three different teams in the Korean Basketball League, winning back-to-back championships in 2013 and 2014 with the Ulsan Mobis Phoebus. Towards the end of the 2013–2014 season the relationship with the team turned sour and he was cut shortly before the start of the new season under allegations of demanding more money, which Benson himself denied.

After three months of preparation in his home state of California, Benson was picked up by the team of Bank of Taiwan of the Taiwanese Super Basketball League in December 2014.

After having played just five games in the SBL, averaging 18 points and 11 rebounds, Benson signed a deal with GlobalPort Batang Pier of the Philippine Basketball Association (PBA) in early January 2015. The team chose him out of a group of four prospects as their import player in hopes of winning the PBA Commissioner's Cup, but Benson exceeded the team's 6'9" height limit and was replaced shortly after.

In early June 2015 Benson was signed by the Dominican National League's Indios de San Francisco de Macorís. In his first game after the short hiatus he scored 8 points, 9 rebounds and 2 assists in 25 minutes.

Art 
After retiring from basketball in 2018, Benson took up several hobbies, including painting fine art. 

Badly shaken in July 2018, after experiencing police brutality in Las Vegas, Benson realized he could use painting to provide himself with a positive outlook.

He has his debut solo show entitled "Neon Black" in September 2018 and received critical acclaim for his efforts.

Media coverage and blog
Benson writes a personal blog titled Too Much Rod Benson, as well as contributing to the Ball Don't Lie blog on Yahoo! Sports.

He wrote an autobiographical feature article that was published in SLAM Magazine in April 2008. He has also been featured in ESPN The Magazine,  and was profiled on the ESPN television series E:60 by Bill Simmons in April 2008.

Benson's blogging has actually been viewed in a negative light by some NBA executives, however, who actually call it a "red flag"—not only because they see him spending time writing and filming instead of working on his game (a notion Benson disputes, citing his 2007–08 NBDL All-Star status), but also because they fear the free-spirited Benson will break the "locker room code" and write candidly about coaches, teammates, & the front office. But Benson maintains that he still has to "keep it real": "What you get is a blog that chronicles the ridiculousness that I call my life, complete with photos, videos, and whatever else may be necessary for you to get the point."

BOOMTHO!
BOOMTHO! is the California-based lifestyle brand founded by Benson in 2006. It is devoted to the philosophy of "having fun, being ridiculous, and being yourself"  with bright, fun styles that epitomize West Coast culture.

The phrase "Boom Tho" was started by Benson (founder & CEO) while attending UC Berkeley. In addition to being a catchphrase, BOOMTHO! grew from a blog and T-shirt line to a full men and women's clothing line featuring T-shirts, tank tops, hats, swim gear, and sweatshirts. Currently, BOOMTHO! is a lifestyle brand covering clothing and accessories,  music, videos, and athletics. Benson also designs all BOOMTHO! merchandise.

BOOMTHO! products are sold worldwide via BoomThoShop.com and have gained support by famous actors, athletes, and musicians. Some notable fans are Blake Griffin, Juelz Santana, Gordon Hayward, and The Rej3ctz, amongst many others.

References

External links
Rod Benson Fine Art
NBDL player profile
Ball Don't Lie – articles by Benson
Benson's YouTube channel
University of California Athletics profile
ESPN college profile
Sports Illustrated piece about Benson's popularity on the internet

1984 births
Living people
American male bloggers
American bloggers
American expatriate basketball people in France
American expatriate basketball people in South Korea
American expatriate basketball people in the Dominican Republic
Atléticos de San Germán players
Austin Toros players
Basketball players from California
California Golden Bears men's basketball players
Centers (basketball)
Dakota Wizards players
People from Fairfield, California
Power forwards (basketball)
Reno Bighorns players
SLUC Nancy Basket players
Wonju DB Promy players
Changwon LG Sakers players
Ulsan Hyundai Mobis Phoebus players
American men's basketball players
American expatriate basketball people in Taiwan
Bank of Taiwan basketball players
Super Basketball League imports